Nikolaos Gkountoulas (born 4 February 1985 in Servia, Kozani) is a Greek rower.  At the 2012 Summer Olympics, he competed in the men's pair with his twin brother, Apostolos Gkountoulas.

They also won men's lightweight pairs at the 2008 World Championship and the openweight pair at the 2009 and 2011 European Championship.  They also won the bronze at the 2009 World Championships.

Together, they were also part of the Greek team that won the men's coxless fours at the 2008 and 2012 European Championship, won the silver medal at the 2010 World Championships and came second in the 2010 European Championships.

References

External links 
 

1985 births
Living people
Greek male rowers
Rowers at the 2012 Summer Olympics
Olympic rowers of Greece
World Rowing Championships medalists for Greece
European Rowing Championships medalists
People from Servia
Sportspeople from Western Macedonia